Danzi or D'Anzi is a surname. Notable people with the surname include:

 Francesca Lebrun, née Danzi (1756 – 1791), 18th-century German singer and composer
 Franz Danzi (Franz Ignaz Danzi) (1763 – 1826), German cellist, composer and conductor
 Danzi Quintet, a Dutch wind quintet
 Margarethe Danzi, née Marchand (1768 – 1800), German composer and soprano; wife of Franz
 Gianni Danzi (1940 – 2007), an Italian Roman Catholic Archbishop of the Territorial Prelature of Loreto
 Giovanni D'Anzi (1906, Milan – 1974), Italian songwriter
 Carmelo D'Anzi (born 1956, Messina), Italian-American football coach and player

Italian-language surnames